Jacob Gross may refer to:
 Jacob Gross (piano maker), German piano maker
 Jacob Gross (Illinois politician), German American businessman and politician
 Jacob A. Gross, American lawyer and politician from New York. 
 Jack J. Gross, or Jacob Jerome Gross, film and television producer